Matthew Mooney (born February 7, 1995) is an American professional basketball player for Darüşşafaka Lassa of the Basketball Super League (BSL) in Turkey. He played college basketball for the Texas Tech Red Raiders and South Dakota having transferred after his freshman year at Air Force.

Early life and high school career
Mooney has a younger brother Joe who is also a basketball player. He attended Notre Dame College Prep and commuted two hours from Wauconda, Illinois to play under coach Tom Les. Mooney was lightly recruited. He had two college offers coming out of high school and signed with Air Force.

College career
Mooney averaged 6.9 points per game as a freshman at Air Force. However, he had trouble getting adjusted to the strictness of the military culture and experienced bullying. After the season, he opted to transfer.

After sitting out a season, Mooney averaged 18.6 points per game as a sophomore for South Dakota, leading the team to a regular season championship. He was named to the First–team All-Summit League and newcomer of the year. As a junior, Mooney averaged 18.7 points, 4.1 rebounds and 3.1 assists. He was named to the First–team All-Summit League again. He had 31 points in a loss to TCU and 30 points in a loss to South Dakota State in the Summit League championship. Following the season, Mooney opted to transfer as a graduate student, selecting Texas Tech over offers from Northwestern and Creighton.

Texas Tech was coming off a season in which the team reached the Elite Eight but lost some important pieces. Mooney averaged 11 points per game and shot 38 percent from behind the arc. He partnered with Jarrett Culver to help the team reach its first-ever Final Four. Mooney scored 17 points in an upset of Gonzaga in the Elite Eight. In Texas Tech's first Final Four appearance on April 6, 2019, Mooney scored 22 points in Texas Tech's 61-51 defeat of Michigan State to advance to the 2019 NCAA Men's Basketball Championship game. Texas Tech would lose the championship game to Virginia 85-77 in overtime. Mooney was then named to the 2019 All-Tournament Team.

Professional career

Memphis Hustle (2019–2020)
After going undrafted in the 2019 NBA draft, Mooney joined the Atlanta Hawks' Summer League roster.

On September 4, 2019, Mooney signed an Exhibit 10 contract with the Memphis Grizzlies, but was waived on October 14. He was named to the roster of the Grizzlies’ NBA G League affiliate, the Memphis Hustle.

Cleveland Cavaliers (2020)
On January 15, 2020, Mooney was signed to a two-way contract by the Cleveland Cavaliers. Under the terms of the deal, he will split time between the Cavs and their G League affiliate, the Canton Charge. He made his NBA debut on January 20, recording two points, a rebound and an assist in three minutes in a 106-86 loss to the New York Knicks. Mooney was waived on December 19, 2020.

Raptors 905 (2021)
On January 27, 2021, Mooney signed with Raptors 905. He averaged 11.6 points and 5.7 assists per game.

Capitanes de Ciudad de México (2021)
On October 24, 2021, Mooney signed with Capitanes de Ciudad de México of the NBA G League. In 12 games, he averaged 15.2 points, 4.6 assists, 4.3 rebounds and 2.17 steals over 32.8 minutes per game.

New York Knicks (2021–2022)
On December 21, 2021, Mooney signed a 10-day contract with the New York Knicks. He signed a second 10-day contract with the Knicks on December 31. Mooney played one game for the Knicks and had one steal.

Unicaja (2022)
On January 31, 2022, he was signed with Unicaja of the Liga ACB.

Niners Chemnitz (2022–present)
On August 12, 2022, he has signed with Niners Chemnitz of the Basketball Bundesliga (BBL).

Beşiktaş (2022–2023)
On October 7, 2022, he has signed with Beşiktaş Emlakjet of the Basketbol Süper Ligi (BSL).

Darüşşafaka (2023–present)
On January 29, 2023, he signed with Darüşşafaka Lassa of the Basketball Super League (BSL).

Career statistics

NBA

Regular season

|-
| style="text-align:left;"|
| style="text-align:left;"|Cleveland
| 4 || 0 || 4.8 || .250 || .000 || – || .8 || .3 || .5 || .3 || .5
|-
| style="text-align:left;"|
| style="text-align:left;"|New York
| 1 || 0 || 2.0 || .000 || .000 ||  || .0 || .0 || 1.0 || .0 || .0
|- class="sortbottom"
| style="text-align:center;" colspan="2"|Career
| 5 || 0 || 4.2 || .200 || .000 ||  || .6 || .2 || .6 || .2 || .4

College

|-
| style="text-align:left;"|2014–15
| style="text-align:left;"|Air Force
| 29 || 8 || 19.2 || .448 || .387 || .786 || 1.9 || 1.8 || .8 || .1 || 6.9
|-
| style="text-align:left;"|2016–17
| style="text-align:left;"|South Dakota
| 34 || 34 || 31.1 || .460 || .367 || .717 || 4.5 || 2.1 || 2.2 || .1 || 18.6
|-
| style="text-align:left;"|2017–18
| style="text-align:left;"|South Dakota
| 34 || 34 || 30.6 || .445 || .352 || .829 || 4.1 || 3.1 || 2.0 || .1 || 18.7
|-
| style="text-align:left;"|2018–19
| style="text-align:left;"|Texas Tech
| 38 || 38 || 31.0 || .426 || .386 || .782 || 3.1 || 3.3 || 1.8 || .1 || 11.3
|- class="sortbottom"
| style="text-align:center;" colspan="2"|Career
| 135 || 114 || 28.4 || .446 || .368 || .772 || 3.4 || 2.6 || 1.7 || .1 || 14.1

References

External links
Texas Tech Red Raiders bio

1997 births
Living people
Air Force Falcons men's basketball players
American expatriate basketball people in Canada
American expatriate basketball people in Mexico
American men's basketball players
Baloncesto Málaga players
Basketball players from Chicago
Beşiktaş men's basketball players
Canton Charge players
Capitanes de Ciudad de México players
Cleveland Cavaliers players
Darüşşafaka Basketbol players
Liga ACB players
Memphis Hustle players
New York Knicks players
NINERS Chemnitz players
People from Wauconda, Illinois
Raptors 905 players
Shooting guards
South Dakota Coyotes men's basketball players
Texas Tech Red Raiders basketball players
Undrafted National Basketball Association players